The year 1507 in science and technology included many events, some of which are listed here.

Cartography
 April 25 – Martin Waldseemüller publishes Cosmographiae Introductio ("Introduction to Universal Cosmography", probably written by Matthias Ringmann) and accompanying wall map, the first to show and name the Americas as a separate continent.
 Johannes Ruysch's map of the world is first published in editions of Ptolemy's Geography produced in Rome.

Births
 September 27 – Guillaume Rondelet, French physician (died 1566)

Deaths
 July 29 – Martin Behaim, German navigator and geographer (born 1459)

References

 
16th century in science
1500s in science